E. rubra  may refer to:
 Eos rubra, the red lory, a parrot species
 Eugerygone rubra, the garnet robin, a bird species

See also
 Rubra (disambiguation)